The Government College of Art & Craft (GCAC) in Kolkata is one of the oldest Art colleges in India. It was founded on August 16, 1854 at Garanhata, Chitpur, "with the purpose of establishing an institution for teaching the youth of all classes, industrial art based on scientific methods." as the School of Industrial Art. The institute was later renamed as the Government School of Art and in 1951 it became the Government College of Art & Craft.

History
The school opened on August 16, 1854 at Garanhata as a private art school. The school was shifted to the building of Mutty Lall Seal in Colootola in November 1854. In 1859, Garick joined as Head Teacher. In 1864, it was taken over by the government and on June 29, 1864 Henry Hover Locke joined as its principal. It was soon renamed as the Government School of Art. Locke made a comprehensive scheme of Curriculum of studies for the institution. The venue of the school was shifted to 166, Bowbazar Street in the 1880s. After the death of Locke on December 25, 1885 M. Schaumburg became the new principal. A new post of Assistant Principal was created and on January 29, 1886 an Italian artist O. Ghilardi joined the post. In February 1892 the institute was shifted to its present site adjacent to the Indian Museum. After the death of its principal, Jobbins Ernest Binfield Havel joined the school as its principal on July 6, 1896.

Havell, Brown and Abanindranath
Ernest Binfield Havel was the principal from 1896 to 1905. He attempted to reform teaching to emphasise Indian traditions, leading to the emergence of the style known as the Bengal school of art. Percy Brown was the next principal, who took over from the officiating Principal Abanindranath Tagore on January 12, 1909. He served as Principal up to 1927. From August 15, 1905 to 1915, Abanindranath Tagore was the Vice-Principal of the college, and worked towards developing an Indian style of Art, which gave birth to the Bengal school of art, an agenda that was to be pursued at the Kala Bhavan, Shantiniketan.

Mukul Dey as principal
On July 11, 1928 Mukul Chandra Dey became the principal. In October 1931, it started its quarterly magazine, Our Magazine, which published the reproductions of the works of its students and the faculty. Mukul Dey was Principal of the institute till 1943.

Chintamoni Kar as principal
For a long period in the 60s and 70s, it was headed by Chintamoni Kar, who was appointed Principal on August 1, 1956.

Department

Painting
Drawing
Portrait Making
Life Study
Antique Study
Still Life
Composition
Mural
Print Making
Sketch

Indian Painting
Drawing
Life Study
Mural
Composition
Museum Study
Nature Study
Copy from Old Masters
Print Making
Sketch

Modelling & Sculpture
Life Study
Head Study
Portrait
Composition
Moulding and Casting (Bronze and Fiberglass casting)
Stone Carving
Direct Plaster
Clay Modelling
Wood Carving
Terracotta
Repousse (embossing)
Mixed Media

Graphic Design / Applied Art
Drawing
Sketch
Advertising
Print & Electronic Media
3-D Design
Typography
Out-of-Home Advertisement
Illustration
Print Making
Photography
Audio Visual Media

Textile Design
Weaving
Printing (Block Printing, Screen Printing and others)
Dyeing (Tie and Dye, Batik, etc.)
Design
Drawing
Life Study
Sketch

Ceramic Art & Pottery
Designing
Finishing
Glazing
Firing
Ceramic Mural
Ceramic Sculpture
Functional and Expressional Pottery Drawing

Design: Wood and leather
Design and Execution in Wood and Leather
Mixed Media Composition
Water Colour
Oil Colour
Mixed Media
Object Drawing
Life Drawing
Sketch
Painting
Mural
Wooden Sculpture
Interior Design

Printmaking
Relief Process: Lino or Traditional Wood Surface
Planographic: Lithography
Intaglio: Etching
Stencil: Silk Screen
Computer Graphics and Digital Printing

Alumni

 See also: Government College of Art & Craft alumni
Notable alumni of this institute include Nandalal Bose, Jamini Roy, Lain Singh Bangdel, Atul Bose, Somnath Hore, Rajen Tarafdar, Jainul Abedin, Hemen Majumdar, Shanu Lahiri, Ganesh Pyne, Ganesh Haloi, Sunil Das, Samir Mondal, Jogen Chowdhury, Sudip Roy, Pulak Biswas, Ananta Mandal, Paresh Maity, Sanatan Dinda, Biman Bihari Das.

See also 
List of colleges affiliated to the University of Calcutta
Education in India
Education in West Bengal

References

External links
 
Parampara Union Website

Culture of Kolkata
Universities and colleges in Kolkata
Art schools in India
Educational institutions established in 1854
University of Calcutta affiliates
Arts organizations established in 1854
1854 establishments in India